The Rise of Modern Judicial Review: From Judicial Interpretation to Judge-Made Law is a 1986 book by Christopher Wolfe in which the author provides a critique of American judicial review.

Reception
The book was reviewed by Kermit L. Hall, Ward A. Greenberg and Thomas H. Eliot.
Judge Robert Bork, in a Wall Street Journal contribution on Jan 16, 2006, listed the book as one of the five best books on the Constitution.

References

External links 
 The Rise of Modern Judicial Review

1986 non-fiction books
English-language books
Judicial review
Books about politics of the United States
Books in political philosophy
1994 non-fiction books
Rowman & Littlefield books
Basic Books books